The MV Oceanic Viking was an armed patrol vessel of the Australian Customs Service. Originally built in 1996 as the offshore supply vessel Viking Lady for Norwegian shipping company Eidesvik Shipping AS, the ship was converted into a cable layer in 2000 and renamed Oceanic Viking. The ship was chartered to the Australian Customs Service through P&O Marine Services from 2004 to 2010. In 2011, it was purchased by A&P Tyne, Isle of Man, and renamed European Supporter.

Construction
The ship was built in 1996 for Norwegian shipping company Eidesvik Shipping AS as an offshore supply vessel and named Viking Lady.

Operational history

Eidesvik Shipping
In 2000, the ship was converted to a cable layer, renamed Oceanic Viking, and used for laying optic fiber cables between Europe and North America.

Australian Customs Service
In 2004, Oceanic Viking was converted to an armed patrol vessel and bareboat chartered to P&O Maritime Services, who operated the ship for the Australian Customs Marine Unit. The vessel was primarily assigned to patrols of Australia's southern offshore territories for illegal fishers, particularly those seeking Patagonian toothfish, but was also deployed on other border protection and patrol operations around Australia. While chartered, Oceanic Viking was flagged as an Australian vessel, and was operated by a 60-strong crew, including Customs and Fisheries personnel, along with civilians. Oceanic Viking was fitted with two .50 calibre machine guns, making it the first Australian-flagged merchant vessel to be armed in peacetime.

In early September 2005, Oceanic Viking intercepted a  Cambodian vessel found poaching in the Southern Ocean. Later that month, the ship apprehended three Indonesian vessels illegally fishing near the Northern Territory's Wessel Islands; one of the vessels failed to stop when ordered, and one of Oceanic Vikings machine guns was used to fire warning shots.

In October 2006, Oceanic Viking traveled  in eight days to answer a distress call from the Kerguelen Islands.

In December 2007, the Australian Government tasked the Oceanic Viking with monitoring Japanese-flagged vessels involved in whaling in the Southern Ocean. During the seven-week surveillance exercise, personnel aboard Oceanic Viking filmed Japanese whalers and their activities to gather evidence for possible legal action. The machine guns were secured below deck during the surveillance mission. During the deployment, two Sea Shepherd Conservation Society protesters who boarded the whaling ship Yūshin Maru No. 2 were transferred to Oceanic Viking after being detained by the Japanese. The Australian government regarded the operation as successful, but it was criticised by some political commentators, such as Dennis Shanahan, as not having been effective in countering Japanese whaling, and potentially harming Japanese-Australian relations.

In October 2009, Oceanic Viking was involved in an operation to apprehend 78 Sri Lankan asylum seekers and move them to an Australia-funded immigration detention centre on the Indonesian island of Bintan for processing. The asylum seekers were taken to Indonesia but refused to disembark until 17 November, after a preferential processing deal was agreed upon. The 78 asylum seekers were transferred to Indonesian detention, and after a month, were determined to be refugees by the United Nations High Commissioner for Refugees and resettled in several countries. While travelling back to Australia, Oceanic Viking intercepted a boat on 3 December carrying 53 suspected asylum seekers and four crew off the Ashmore Islands; the 50th asylum seeker vessel to be intercepted in Australian waters for the year 2009.

European Supporter

Oceanic Viking was taken out of service in June 2011. It was replaced by the chartered offshore supply ship MV Skandi Bergen which was renamed ACV Ocean Protector. Oceanic Viking subsequently became the UK-flagged MV European Supporter.

The European Supporter was fitted out at A&P Tyne, so she would be able to install power cables between wind turbines to take advantage of the rapidly expanding offshore renewables market in the UK and Europe. A 7m long abrasion resistant steel chute was installed onto the vessel’s stern, from which cables could be lowered onto the sea bed. Other work included a major overhaul of the generators, modifications to the steelwork inside the hangar accommodating the ROVs and to the switchboard, electrical repairs and refurbishment of the pumps. The European Supporter has the capacity to accommodate 5,000 tons of power cable in two static tanks, using a newly installed power cable loading arm.

References

Ships built in Norway
Patrol vessels of the Marine Unit (Australian Border Force)
1996 ships
Merchant ships of the Isle of Man